The Republic of Poland ambassador to France is the official representative of the Government of Poland to the Government of France.

The embassy is located in Hôtel de Monaco in Paris. In addition there is Consulate General in Lyon.

List of ambassadors
<onlyinclude>

See also 
List of ambassadors of France to Poland

References 

 
France
Poland